The following lists of lakes of Western Australia are arranged alphabetically:

List of lakes of Western Australia, A–C (plus numerals)
List of lakes of Western Australia, D–K
List of lakes of Western Australia, L–P
List of lakes of Western Australia, Q–Z

Western Australia geography-related lists
Western Australia
Lists of tourist attractions in Western Australia